Stormbringer may refer to:

 Stormbringer, magical black sword featured in fantasy stories by Michael Moorcock
 Stormbringer (novel), 1965 novel by Michael Moorcock
 Stormbringer (role-playing game) by Chaosium, based on Moorcock's stories
 Stormbringer (album), a 1974 album by Deep Purple
 Stormbringer!, a 1970 album by John and Beverley Martyn
 Stormbringer (video game), written by David Jones and released in 1987 by Mastertronic
 The Transformers: Stormbringer, comic book miniseries published by IDW Publishing